CD58, or lymphocyte function-associated antigen 3 (LFA-3), is a cell adhesion molecule expressed on Antigen Presenting Cells (APC), particularly macrophages.

It binds to CD2 (LFA-2)  on T cells and is important in strengthening the adhesion between the T cells and Professional Antigen Presenting Cells. This adhesion occurs as part of the transitory initial encounters between T cells and Antigen Presenting Cells before T cell activation, when  T cells are roaming the lymph nodes looking at the surface of APCs for peptide:MHC complexes the T-cell receptors are reactive to.

Polymorphisms in the CD58 gene are associated with increased risk for multiple sclerosis. Genomic region containing the single-nucleotide polymorphism rs1335532, associated with high risk of multiple sclerosis, has enhancer properties and can significantly boost the CD58 promoter activity in lymphoblast cells. The protective (C) rs1335532 allele creates functional binding site for ASCL2 transcription factor, a target of the Wnt signaling pathway

CD58 plays a role in the regulation of colorectal tumor-initiating cells (CT-ICs). Thus, cells that express CD58 have become a cell of interest in tumorigenesis. Mutations of CD58 have been linked to immune evasion observed in some lymphomas and studies are underway to analyze how its involvement directly affects classical Hodgkin lymphoma (cHL).

References

External links 
 

Human proteins